St Orland's Stone (otherwise known as the Cossans stone or the Cossins stone) is a Class II Pictish Cross-Slab at Cossans, near Kirriemuir and Forfar, Angus, Scotland

Location

Description
The slab is carved on both faces in relief and, as it bears Pictish symbols, it falls into John Romilly Allen and Joseph Anderson's classification system as a class II stone.

The cross face bears a ringed Celtic cross decorated with interlaced knotwork and spiral designs. It is surrounded in the lower two quadrants by interlaced fantastic beasts. The border appears to have once borne knotwork designs, but is weathered and difficult to interpret.

The rear face bears crescent and v-rod and double disc and z-rod Pictish symbols. Below this is what appears to be a hunting scene, with four horsemen accompanied by two hounds, below this is a boat loaded with passengers and a depiction of a fantastic beast facing or attacking a bull. A quadrangular section between the Pictish symbols and figural carving is missing, and appears to have been cut out or a previously inlaid section has been removed. The carving is bordered by interlaced knotwork.

At some point, the stone has been broken and has been repaired using iron staples, formerly on the faces of the stone, now on the edges, to reinforce it.

References

Pictish stones
Pictish stones in Angus, Scotland
Scheduled Ancient Monuments in Angus